Shibaura is Jun Shibata's second compilation album. It was released on March 14, 2007, and peaked at No. 36 in Japan.

Track listing
Sora no iro (空の色; Color of the Sky)
Yume (夢; Dream)
Wasuremono (忘れもの; Lost Objects)
Okaerinasai. (おかえりなさい。; Welcome Home.)
Kanbeer (缶ビール; Can Beer)
Shuuden (終電; Last Train)
Henshin (変身; Metamorphosis)
Utsukushii hito (美しい人; Beautiful Person)
Hikari (光; Light)
Shiawase na uta (幸せなうた; Happy Song)
Kaerimichi (帰り道; The Way Home)
Ichibanboshi (いちばん星; The First Star)
Boku no mikata (Indies Version) (ぼくの味方 （インディーズバージョン）; My Friend (Indies Version))
Pink no kumo (ピンクの雲; Pink Clouds)

Charts

External links
http://www.shibatajun.com— Shibata Jun Official Website 

2007 compilation albums
Jun Shibata albums